Hwang Young-min (born December 23, 1981), best known as Tim, is a Korean-American singer based in South Korea. He is referred to as South Korea's "ballad prince." He debuted in 2003 with the album, First Tim, which included the hit ballad, "I Love You."

Life and career

Early life and works 
Tim was born in Philadelphia and raised just west of the city in Upper Darby to a Christian family with his father as a pastor for a local church, and has four brothers. He was exposed to a musical environment early on as a child. At his father's church, he naturally learned to play various instruments like the saxophone and piano. Throughout his childhood, Tim pursued musical activities in both schools and churches, as a member of the church choir and a saxophonist in the school jazz band. However, until he was picked up by an entertainment agency, he had never thought of becoming a professional singer. During his high school career, Tim also modeled and acted.

Prior to his singing debut, however, Tim was in charge of an MTV Korea program called "Tim's World" (started on December 2, 2002) which showed documentaries on the path and struggles of new singers like himself.

Debut 
The story told as by Tim has it that at the age of 20, Tim was approached by a Korean pop music producer (the son of a fellow church member). After listening to a tape, it was requested that Tim fly to Korea for a full audition to make a debut as a pop singer in Korea. Though he and his family had a very conservative background, Tim decided to fly to Seoul alone for the first time, give up his life as a college student and try his hand at becoming a Korean pop singer. Having never had visited Korea until he graduated high school, Tim spent the first two years in Korea focusing on learning the Korean language and preparing for his debut as a singer. While training for his debut album, Tim was very fortunate to have met Yoon Sang, one of the top songwriters in Korea and also a great senior and mentor as a singer. Yoon Sang wrote "사랑합니다 (I Love You)," a soft ballad that matches Tim's voice and image perfectly. Tim was supported by Yoon Sang in creating his musical style, and his debut album (released April 21, 2003 by Yejeon Media) received great response. Tim began gaining great recognition in the local pop music market when senior ballad singers like Shin Seung Hun commented favorably on Tim's music.  His second album Second Breath was able to mirror the success of his first album with the hits "Gomawottago. .. (I Was Thankful)" and "Iyagi (The Story)."

He has since appeared on a number of Korean variety shows such as Love Letter, Strong Heart, X-Man, Star Golden Bell, and Heroine 6.

TV Series: "SARANGHAE, I LOVE YOU" with Revalina S. Temat (2012)

Personal life 
In 2020, Tim married businesswoman Kim Bo-ra, with whom he had been in a relationship for 8 years. Later, on March 29, 2022, his wife gave birth to their first son.

Discography

Studio albums

Extended plays

Contributed singles and songs

As featured artist

Music videos

Filmography 
 2017: Just for You

Awards

Notes

References

External links
Official Twitter
Artist Profile on Mnet 

1981 births
American musicians of Korean descent
K-pop singers
Korean-language singers of the United States
Living people
Musicians from Philadelphia
Temple University alumni
21st-century American male singers
21st-century American singers
21st-century South Korean male singers